Ferencvárosi Torna Club, known as Ferencváros, Fradi, or simply FTC - Ferencvárosi Torna Club, is a professional football club based in Ferencváros, Budapest, Hungary, that competes in the Női NB I, the top flight of Hungarian women's football. Founded in 2004, it is the women's football section of the multisport club Ferencvárosi TC.

The club became national champions for the first time in 2014–15, dethroning rivals MTK Hungária who had won the previous five successive Női NB I titles.

Honours
Női NB I
Winners (5): 2014–2015, 2015–2016, 2018–2019, 2020–2021, 2021–2022

Hungarian Women's Cup
Winners (6): 2015, 2016, 2017, 2018, 2019, 2021

UEFA Competitions record

Current squad

Former players

References

External links
 Profile at UEFA.com

Ferencvárosi TC
Football clubs in Budapest
Women's football clubs in Hungary
Association football clubs established in 2004
2004 establishments in Hungary